Evaz (also Romanized as Awadh, Avaz, Evazeh, and ‘ewaz) is a city and capital of Evaz County, in  Fars Province, Iran.  At the 2006 census, its population was 14,315, in 3,297 families. The people of Evaz are native Persians of Zoroastrian origin who later converted to Sunni Islam. The people of Ewaz speak Ewazii. The majority of Evazi Persians are Sunni Muslims.

It is one of the fastest-growing towns in the region due in large part to a number of Evazi individuals who provide financial support for the development of robust academic infrastructure.

Geography

City

The town of Evaz is located in the Fars province of Iran and about 370 kilometers southeast of Shiraz. Evaz is situated about 970 meters above sea level in a valley stretching approximately thirty kilometers in length and four kilometers in breadth with low mountains to the North and South.

Flora and Fauna
Truffles, an underground mushroom, is commonly found in the region.

Climate

Evaz receives minimal rainfall, estimated to be approximately 7.5 cm (3 inches) on average per year.

Summers are hot and dry with temperatures reaching as high as 46 °C during the day.

Winters are usually cold and similarly dry. Spring and autumn provide a more moderate and pleasant climate.

Temperatures usually drop at night time throughout the year due to being geographically situated in a valley.

Demographics
Due to a history of mass migration, the precise number of Evazis in the world is difficult to determine at this stage. Many have migrated to other countries, majority of whom to the Arab states of the Persian Gulf (due to the close proximity and cultural ties), some have moved to Europe in countries such as Sweden and more recently to the US and Canada have also hosted significant migration. It has been estimated that approximately 7,000 are outside Evaz but in Iran. It is estimated that at least half a million of Larestanis people of which about 50,000 are of Evazi origin are estimated to live in Arab States of the Persian Gulf.

Ethnicity

The Evazi people consider themselves and their traditions as "Khodmooni" which literally translates to "of our own" in Persian language and Larestani dialects. Some view this as an expression of emphasis that Evazi (Larestani) ethnic group distinguishing themselves from other Iranians. Many Arabized people that are of Evazi origin have their last names as "alawadhi".

Evazi Larestani are of mixed origins that have become a unique ethnic group.

Genetics
YDNA results of 46 Evazi samples in FamilytreeDNA has shown that 4 evazi samples belong to haplogroup E-M35 (8.7%), 12 samples belong to haplogroup G-M201 (26.1%) all of them are within G1 haplogroup, 14 samples belong to haplogroup J-M172 (J2) (30.4%), 1 sample belong to haplogroup L (2.2%), 5 samples belong to haplogroup R1a (10.8%), 7 samples belong to haplogroup R1b-M269 (15.2%) and all of these samples belong to R-PH4902 branch and 3 samples belong to haplogroup R2a (6.5%).

Language

The spoken language of Evaz is a dialect form of Achomi vernacular to Evazi, which is distinct from a language with the influence of other languages making up the mix of Achomee or Larestani ethnic. It is also maintained by some that it is sister to New Persian though it is difficult to verify this claim since the grammatical structure of Evazi Achomi language is different from its Persian counterpart, though many common vocabularies exist in both. 
The word "Achomi" is used by Persian Gulf Arab citizens of Larestani ethnicity.

Evazi language is a form of the ancient Persian language. Compared to the other present day Iranian languages, it has the fewest Arabic or other foreign languages.

Today, Evazi as a mother tongue is being increasingly abandoned by the younger generation in favour of Persian, Arabic or English. Among the Evazis who have migrated to other countries, many still speak the Evazi dialect at home. However, the large majority of migrants from previous generations have adopted their new domicile's language as either a first or second language. In many cases, the cultural roots of those whose families have migrated several decades ago have been eroded and replaced by the new language of necessity. The most prominent example of this is a large number of Arab nationals of the Cooperation Council for the Arab States of the Gulf (especially in Bahrain, U.A.E. and Qatar) with Evazi (Larestani) roots that have for the most part replaced Evazi with Arabic over the years. Even the word Evaz is now predominantly replaced with "Awadh"

Except for 1% or 2% of Evazis of African ethnicity whose ancestors were brought to Evaz for domestic work (To editors: This phrase was part of my sentence and has been incorrectly edited by the previous member), like the rest of the fellow  Larestani Ethnic, they are a mix of Arab, Afghan, Baluch, Lur, Persian due to the consecutive migratory interactions as well as invasions which have occurred within the region of Larestan.

Except for 1% or 2% of the Evazis of African ethnicity whose ancestors were brought to Evaz for domestic work, the rest of Evazis are of Persian ethnicity.

Education

Evaz is one of the few towns in Fars to aggressively develop its academic infrastructure. In 2011, there were four kindergartens, ten elementary schools, eight secondary schools and six high schools in Evaz. 
It is well known that the people of Evaz have the highest rate of education per capita amongst their fellow Larestani counterparts.

Higher Education
Evaz houses a branch of Payame Noor University as well as the Islamic Azad University. Due to lack of financial resources and support in the region, several philanthropic families have privately provided financial aid for 'Payame Noor University' in an effort to create opportunities for residents.

Religion

As opposed to most other parts of Iran, Sunni Islam is the dominant religion in Evaz.

Culture and Tradition
Evazi people like most of the Larestanis celebrate the customary holidays and events observed by the GCC as well as the traditional Persian such as Mehrgan, Yalda, Tirgan except Nowruz as it is the traditional Persian new year calendar.

Weddings
Evazi weddings are festive occasions. Due to the volume of Evazi migration, weddings will vary depending on the conservatism of the host country and wedding attendees. Traditionally, the customs are closer to the weddings performed within the GCC countries due to the cultural heritage and closeness of the Larestani ethnic with the Arabs of GCC. 
Except for some Evazi weddings in the Persian Gulf Arab States, Evazi weddings follow the Islamic tradition (separation of sexes) with some influences of the Iranian heritage while hosting nation's customs overseas.

See also

Larestan
Lar, Iran
Gerash
Fars province
Kookherd
Fishvar
bidshahr

References

External links
 Evaz Nama | news and analysis website of Evaz.
 Evaz4U It's maybe known as the official website of the town.
 Ewazstars Off the town running website, mostly related to the news of Evaz & Iran
 Ewaz Football Website The Official Website Of Evaz's Football. Contains Football News Of Evaz and Area.
 Asr e Evaz Newspaper  website of Asr e Evaz Newspaper.

 Populated places in Evaz County
 Cities in Fars Province